Lim Jun Liang (born 12 March 1987), also known as Maxi Lim, is a Singaporean actor.

Personal life
Lim graduated from Temasek Polytechnic (School of Design).

Lim married actress Liz Teo on 29 March 2020. They announced that they are expecting a child in September. On 29 August, Teo given birth to a baby boy named Reign.

Career
Lim is best known for playing the comical and eager-to-please "Wayang King" in hit local movie Ah Boys to Men series.

Filmography

Film

Television series

Radio show

Theater

Awards and nominations

References

External links
 Profile at Fly Entertainment
 
 

Living people
1987 births
Singaporean people of Chinese descent
Singaporean male film actors
Singaporean male television actors